Rhynchotus  is a genus of birds in the tinamou family. This genus comprises two members of this South American family.

Taxonomy
Tinamous have evolved from ratites and are the only extant ratites that fly, and are the closest to the ancestral flying ratites.

Species

The species are:

Footnotes

References
 
 
 
 ITIS

 
Bird genera